Fuchs Petrolub SE is a German multinational manufacturer of lubricants, and related speciality products.

The company's headquarters are at Mannheim, Baden-Württemberg, Germany, where the company was founded in 1931. Fuchs is a public company listed on the Frankfurt Stock Exchange. As of 2008, it is a constituent of the MDAX trading index of German mid-cap companies.

Fuchs products
Fuchs produces a wide range of products, which include automotive lubricants (engine motor oils and transmission, for motor cars, motorcycles, agricultural, plant and stationary engines), metalworking lubricants, industrial, civil engineering, and hydraulic products. Fuchs also produces the Planto range of biodegradable products.

Automotive products
 Fuchs Titan is a range of products aimed at motor cars, trucks, buses, agricultural and plant equipment.
 Fuchs Silkolene is a product range specifically for motorcycles.
 Fuchs Maintain Fricofin is a range of automotive coolants.

Industrial products
 Fuchs Renolin are a range of hydraulic and industrial gearbox lubricants.

Civil Engineering products
 Fuchs Renocast are a range of mould release agents, used when casting concrete.

Mechanical Engineering products
 Fuchs Ecocut and Ecocool are fluids for metalworking, specifically cutting and general machining.
 Fuchs Renoform and Trenoil are used for forming metals, be that die drawing, rolling or pressing, in both hot and cold processes.
 Fuchs Thermisol are a range of quenching oils, used for heat treatment processes, including annealing and tempering.

General application products
 Fuchs Renolit are a range of greases used across their entire portfolio, including aviation and food processing.
 The Fuchs Anticorit range are non-toxic protectives for anti-corrosion, across a wide variety of applications, and are particularly suited to packaging, storage and transportation

Fuchs Lubritech
Fuchs Lubritech is a division that specializes in specialty lubricants, coatings and services for all industrial applications, especially mining, and other types of processing and

The "Silkolene" brand name
The Silkolene brand name has a long history, with the company originating in England.  Initially, it was called Dalton and Company, being named after its founder, and sold Silkolene products.  However, recognising the strength of the Silkolene brand, in the early 1980s, the company was renamed Silkolene Lubricants.  In 1989, Silkolene Lubricants was acquired by the German Fuchs group, and the products were subsequently renamed Fuchs Silkolene.

The products themselves gained a high international regard.  The Silkolene company developed specialist lubricants for aviation, including oils for the Merlin engine, as used in the Spitfire, Hurricane and Lancaster, to name a few.  Silkolene dedicated many years on technical cooperation with the US Air Force, and was also involved with the supersonic passenger aircraft, Concorde.  The company amassed expertise with synthetic lubricant technology, and Silkolene became a recognised world leader in the field of synthetic lubricants, including esters.

Synthetic lubricant technology continued, and in the early 1990s, developments continued to include Aerospace engineering,  along with motorsports, including rallying and motorcycle racing.  An early partnership was with Honda UK Motorcycle Race Team.  With positive market exposure, coupled with a very high degree of research and development (R&D), and success in competition, Silkolene products became the market leader in the UK.

Presently, Silkolene products continue to be manufactured at Hanley, Stoke-on-Trent, in England.  They are now also made in Germany, the US, and South East Asia. Fuchs purchased the British Batoyle Freedom Group company of Norfolk in 2014.

Fuchs in motorsports
Fuchs, like many of their competitor brands of lubricants, have a strong worldwide presence in motorsports, particularly in Europe and the USA.

In the 2-wheel automotive segment, the Fuchs Silkolene brand sponsors many different classes of motorcycle racing, including prototype based racing: MotoGP, and production based SuperBike and SuperSports racing: World SuperBikes, World SuperSports, British SuperBikes.  The brand has also been involved with Motorcross, speedway and karting (sponsoring Hudson Motorsport and Freddie Housley). Fuchs have a current long-term partnership with Kawasaki motorcycles, although they also sponsor Honda, Suzuki and Yamaha. Silkolene have also participated in the Isle of Man TT races, arguably, the toughest test in the world for any motorcycle.

In Australia, in 2016 Fuchs are sponsoring V8 Supercar teams Brad Jones Racing and Team 18, having previously sponsored Tasman Motorsport, Stone Brothers Racing and Erebus Motorsport, as well as drag racing teams John Zappia Racing and Lamattina Top Fuel Racing.

References

External links

  (English)
  (German)
 Frankfurt Stock Exchange listing (Deutsche Börse)
 Bloomberg
 Reuters
 Fuchs Lubricants

Motor oils
Oil companies of Germany
Manufacturing companies of Germany
Multinational companies headquartered in Germany
Companies based in Baden-Württemberg
Companies based in Mannheim
Manufacturing companies established in 1931
German companies established in 1931
Companies listed on the Frankfurt Stock Exchange
German brands
Companies in the MDAX